Tanbaku Kar-e Ebrahim (also Romanized as Tanbākū Kār-e Ebrāhīm; also known as Tanbākū Kār-e Do) is a village in Margha Rural District, in the Central District of Izeh County, Khuzestan Province, Iran. At the 2006 census, its population was 67, in 14 families.

References 

Populated places in Izeh County